N-myc proto-oncogene protein also known as N-Myc or basic helix-loop-helix protein 37 (bHLHe37), is a protein that in humans is encoded by the MYCN gene.

Function 

The MYCN gene is a member of the MYC family of transcription factors and encodes a protein with a basic helix-loop-helix (bHLH) domain. This protein is located in the cell nucleus and must dimerize with another bHLH protein in order to bind DNA. N-Myc is highly expressed in the fetal brain and is critical for normal brain development.

The MYCN gene has an antisense RNA, N-cym or MYCNOS, transcribed from the opposite strand which can be translated to form a protein product. N-Myc and MYCNOS are co-regulated both in normal development and in tumor cells, so it is possible that the two transcripts are functionally related. It has been shown that the antisense RNA encodes for a protein, named NCYM, that has originated de novo and is specific to human and chimpanzee. This NCYM protein inhibits GSK3b and thus prevents MYCN degradation. Transgenic mice that harbor human MYCN/NCYM pair often show neuroblastomas with distant metastasis, which are atypical for normal mice. Thus NCYM represents a rare example of a de novo gene that has acquired molecular function and plays a major role in oncogenesis.

Clinical significance 
Amplification and overexpression of N-Myc can lead to tumorigenesis. Excess N-Myc is associated with a variety of tumors, most notably neuroblastomas where patients with amplification of the N-Myc gene tend to have poor outcomes. MYCN can also be activated in neuroblastoma and other cancers through somatic mutation. Intriguingly, recent genome-wide H3K27ac profiling in patient-derived NB samples revealed four distinct SE-driven epigenetic subtypes, characterized by their own and specific master regulatory networks. Three of them are named after the known clinical groups: MYCN-amplified, MYCN non-amplified high-risk, and MYCN non-amplified low-risk NBs, while the fourth displays cellular features which resemble multipotent Schwann cell precursors. Interestingly, the cyclin gene CCND1 was regulated through distinct and shared SEs in the different subtypes, and, more importantly, some tumors showed signals belonging to multiple epigenetic signatures, suggesting that the epigenetic landscape is likely to contribute to intratumoral heterogeneity.

Interactions 
N-Myc has been shown to interact with MAX.

N-Myc is also stabilized by aurora A which protects it from degradation. Drugs that target this interaction are under development, and are designed to change the conformation of aurora A. Conformational change in Aurora A leads to release of N-Myc, which is then degraded in a ubiquitin-dependent manner.

Being independent from MYCN/MAX interaction, MYCN is also a transcriptional co-regulator of p53 in MYCN-amplified neuroblastoma. MYCN alters transcription of p53 target genes which regulate apoptosis responses and DNA damage repair in cell cycle. This MYCN-p53 interaction is through exclusive binding of MYCN to C-terminal domains of tetrameric p53. As a post-translational modification, MYCN binding to C-terminal domains of tetrameric p53 impacts p53 promoter selectivity and interferes other cofactors binding to this region.

See also 
Myc

References

Further reading

External links 
 

Transcription factors
Human proteins